Rodrigo Henrique Santana da Silva (born 2 July 1993), known as Rodrigo Henrique, is a Brazilian footballer who plays for Chinese Super League club Meizhou Hakka. He primarily plays as a second striker and as a wide midfielder.

Club career

Early career
Rodrigo Henrique began his career at Oeste joining the club at the age of 18. He made his professional debut in the Campeonato Paulista on 20 March 2013 in a game against Bragantino.

He signed for América-SP in 2014, after which he joined Atlético Pernambucano in 2015.

União da Madeira
After one and a half seasons with Atlético, Rodrigo signed for União da Madeira in Portugal. He made his debut in a 1–0 victory over Freamunde in the game of the Taça de Portugal on 31 July 2016.

Cherno More
On 7 January 2019, Rodrigo signed a contract with Bulgarian club Cherno More Varna.

Meizhou Hakka
On 21 April 2022, Rodrigo joined Chinese Super League club Meizhou Hakka.

Career statistics

Club

References

External links
 

1993 births
Living people
Brazilian footballers
Oeste Futebol Clube players
América Futebol Clube (SP) players
C.F. União players
PFC Cherno More Varna players
Meizhou Hakka F.C. players
Brazilian expatriate footballers
Expatriate footballers in Portugal
Expatriate footballers in Bulgaria
Expatriate footballers in China
Brazilian expatriate sportspeople in Portugal
Brazilian expatriate sportspeople in Bulgaria
Brazilian expatriate sportspeople in China
Liga Portugal 2 players
First Professional Football League (Bulgaria) players
Chinese Super League players
Association football forwards